Più bello di così si muore is a 1982 Italian comedy film  directed by Pasquale Festa Campanile and starring Enrico Montesano, Monica Guerritore and Ida Di Benedetto. It is based on the novel with the same name written by Antonio Amurri, who also collaborated to the screenplay.

Plot

Cast 

 Enrico Montesano as Spartaco Meniconi
 Monica Guerritore as  Amelia
 Ida Di Benedetto as Ottavia
 Vittorio Caprioli as  Count  Nereo Di Sanfilippo
 Toni Ucci as  Agenore
 Paola Borboni as  Nereo's mother
 Franco Caracciolo as  Marcella
  Nicola D'Eramo as  Marcello

See also
 List of Italian films of 1982

References

External links

1982 comedy films
1982 films
Italian comedy films
Films directed by Pasquale Festa Campanile
Cross-dressing in film
Films based on Italian novels
Films scored by Riz Ortolani
1980s Italian-language films
1980s Italian films